Qualification for Golf at the 2020 Summer Olympics in Tokyo was determined not by any form of qualifying tournament, but by the rankings maintained by the International Golf Federation.

Qualification was based on world ranking (Official World Golf Ranking for men, Women's World Golf Rankings for women) as of 21 June 2021 (men) or 28 June 2021 (women), with a total of 60 players qualifying in each of the men's and women's events.  The top 15 players of each gender qualified, with a limit of four golfers per country that could qualify this way. The remaining spots went to the highest-ranked players from countries that did not already have two golfers qualified, with a limit of two per country. The IGF guaranteed that at least one golfer qualified from the host nation and at least one from each continent (Africa, the Americas, Asia, Europe, and Oceania). The IGF posted weekly lists of qualifiers based on current rankings for men and women.

Qualified players

Men
The final rankings for the men's competition were released on 22 June 2021.

The following men removed themselves from possible qualification (world ranking as of 21 June listed):
Dustin Johnson (2), Patrick Cantlay (7) and Brooks Koepka (8) of the United States
Sergio García (48) and Rafa Cabrera-Bello (140) of Spain
Adam Scott (41) of Australia
Bernd Wiesberger (54) of Austria
Danny Lee (191) of New Zealand
Louis Oosthuizen (12) of South Africa
Martin Kaymer (99) and Stephan Jäger (114) of Germany
Tyrrell Hatton (11), Matt Fitzpatrick (21) and Lee Westwood (27) of Great Britain
Camilo Villegas (225) of Colombia
Emiliano Grillo (74) of Argentina
Victor Perez (37) of France
Francesco Molinari (133) of Italy

Additionally, the Dutch Olympic Committee did not allow Joost Luiten (177) and Wil Besseling (221) to participate since they required their participants to be ranked in the top 100 of the world ranking.

Before the start of the competition, Bryson DeChambeau (6) tested positive for COVID-19 and was replaced on the US team by Patrick Reed.
Jon Rahm (1) also withdrew following a positive test and was replaced by Jorge Campillo.

Women
The final rankings for the women's competition were released on 29 June 2021.

The following women removed themselves from possible qualification (world ranking as of 28 June listed):

Charley Hull (ranked 41) and Georgia Hall (51) of Great Britain
Lee-Anne Pace (209) of South Africa
Morgane Métraux (353) of Switzerland
Ashleigh Buhai (86) of South Africa
Marianne Skarpnord (265) of Norway
Two weeks before the competition, Paula Reto (420) of South Africa tested positive for COVID-19 and withdrew. She was replaced in the field by India's Diksha Dagar. Reto subsequently tested negative multiple times and could have played but for her prompt withdrawal in order to allow maximum time for a replacement to prepare.

Qualification summary
The following summarized the NOC's qualified for the Olympic golf tournament with the amount of golfers qualified per country.

Notes

References

Qualification for the 2020 Summer Olympics
Qualification